Nakučani is a village in the municipality of Šabac, Serbia. According to the 2002 census, the village has a population of 640  people.

Notable people 

 Ranko Alimpić, Serbian general and politician

References

External links 

Populated places in Mačva District